Újezd u Průhonic is a municipal district (městská část) in Prague, Czech Republic.

References 

Districts of Prague